The 1963 Princeton Tigers football team was an American football team that represented Princeton University during the 1963 NCAA University Division football season. Princeton was co-champion of the Ivy League.

In their seventh year under head coach Dick Colman, the Tigers compiled a 7–2 record and outscored opponents 247 to 83. William E. Guedel was the team captain.

Princeton's 5–2 conference record tied for best in the Ivy League standings and earned a share of the league championship, even though Princeton had lost to the other co-champion, Dartmouth. The Tigers outscored Ivy opponents 181 to 83. 

Princeton played its home games at Palmer Stadium on the university campus in Princeton, New Jersey.

Schedule

References

Princeton
Princeton Tigers football seasons
Ivy League football champion seasons
Princeton Tigers football